The 1974 Football Championship of Ukrainian SSR was the 44th season of association football competition of the Ukrainian SSR, which was part of the Soviet Second League in Zone 6. The season started on 6 April 1974.

The 1974 Football Championship of Ukrainian SSR was won by FC Sudnobudivnyk Mykolaiv.

Teams

Location map

Relegated teams 
 FC Metalist Kharkiv – (returning for the first time since 1946 (28 seasons))

Promoted teams 
 FC Hranit Cherkasy – (returning after three seasons; the 1973 champion of KFK competitions of the Ukrainian SSR)
 FC Pischevik Bendery – (the 1973 champion of the Moldavian SSR (KFK))

Relocated and renamed teams 
 FC Zvezda Tiraspol was moved to the zone of the Ukrainian championship (previously in Zone 4) and changed its name to FC Tiraspol.

Final standings

Top goalscorers 
The following were the top goalscorers.

See also 
 Soviet Second League

Notes

References

External links 
 1974 Soviet Second League, Zone 6 (Ukrainian SSR football championship). Luhansk football portal
 1974 Soviet championships (all leagues) at helmsoccer.narod.ru

1974
3
Soviet
Soviet
football
Football Championship of the Ukrainian SSR